Stephen Oladimeji K. Akinmurele (16 March 1978 – 28 August 1999) was a British suspected serial killer who was charged with murdering five elderly people between 1995 and 1998.

Initially, he was charged with the murder of an elderly couple, Eric Boardman and Joan Boardman. His third suspected crime was the murder of Jemmimah Cargill. After Cargill, he was also charged with the murders of Dorothy Harris and Marjorie Ashton.

Born in Nigeria, Akinmurele moved to the Isle of Man in 1988. He lived in the island until 1996 when he moved to Blackpool to work as a barman.

Akinmurele had a history of mental illness and had committed crimes against the elderly from the age of 11. He was drawn to situations in which he would encounter the elderly with the police asserting he got a "kick" out of killing old people. Akinmurele confessed to a number of the murders but committed suicide before his trial. Police believe he may have also been responsible for two further killings. The case is notable due to Akinmurele's long-standing hatred of elderly people.

Victims
The victims in the case were all senior citizens; the lead investigator in the case noted that Akinmurele had a "pathological hatred" of old people. He was dubbed "cul-de-sac killer" due to his choice of elderly victims living in quiet suburban streets.

His first two known victims were Eric Boardman, 77, and his wife Joan Boardman, 74. Both were murdered at their home in Blackpool on 30 October 1998. One of their daughters discovered their bodies. Eric, who had been beaten to death, was found under a wardrobe in the hallway of their home. Joan had been strangled to death and was left on the living room floor. Akinmurele used batteries bound together to make a cosh, which was found beneath Eric's body. Akinmurele was arrested and charged with their murders on 1 November 1998.

In the months following his arrest, he was charged for 3 further murders. In November 1998 he was charged for the Jemmimah Cargill, 75, who had previously been his landlady. She died in a flat fire in Blackpool in October 1998 prior to the murder of the Boardmans.

In November and December 1998, following a joint investigation between Lancashire and Manx police, he was charged with 2 murders that had taken place on the Isle of Man. First, he was arrested in connection with the murder of Dorothy Harris, 68, who was killed in February 1996. Harris, who had been partially blind and deaf, was found after a house fire at her home in Ballasalla. The second murder was of Majorie Ashton, 72, who was found strangled in her home, also in Ballasalla, in May 1995.

Detectives in both Lancashire and the Isle of Man believed that Akinmurele may have been responsible for further deaths and carried out re-examinations into house fires and sudden deaths.

While in custody, Akinmurele confessed to three further murders, including that of a rambler on the Isle of Man. He claimed that he had killed the man and buried his body on a cliff overlooking the sea. Manx police found a gun with his fingerprint on but found no body despite extensive excavation. Police believe that Akimurelle made these false confessions in order to hide that his motivation to commit the murders was his hatred for the elderly.

Death
Akinmurele killed himself in Manchester Prison in August 1999. He hung himself by a window with a ligature, just weeks before his trial. He had made two previous attempts on his life, and his girlfriend had warned prison authorities that he was a danger to himself.

A suicide note was found in his pocket after his death, with Akinmurele having written “I know it's not right always thinking like this but it's always on my mind." I can't help the way I feel, what I did was wrong - I know that and I feel for them - but it doesn't mean I won't do it again. I'll keep on having this feeling I'm going mad because I can't take any more of this and that's why I'm saying goodbye." He had also written to this mother that "I couldn’t take  of the feeling like how I do now, always wanting to kill".

See also
 List of serial killers in the United Kingdom

References

1978 births
1999 suicides
20th-century English criminals
Crime in the Isle of Man
English people of Nigerian descent
English people who died in prison custody
English serial killers
History of Blackpool
Male serial killers
Murder in Lancashire
Place of birth missing
Prisoners who died in England and Wales detention
Serial killers who committed suicide in prison custody
Suicides by hanging in England